Stefan Edberg and Anders Järryd defeated Joakim Nyström and Mats Wilander in the final, 6–1, 7–6 to win the doubles tennis title at the 1985 Masters Grand Prix.

Peter Fleming and John McEnroe were the seven-time reigning champions, but failed to qualify this year.

Seeds

  Ken Flach /  Robert Seguso (Semi-finalist)
  Stefan Edberg /  Anders Järryd (champion)
  Paul Annacone /  Christo van Rensburg (Semi-finalist)
  Joakim Nyström /  Mats Wilander (Runner up)

Draw

References
1985 Masters Doubles Draw

Doubles